Mate Brajković (born 18 June 1981 in Sombor) is a Croatian retired football player. The striker last played for NK Turbina.

Career statistics

References

External links
 
 soccerterminal

Living people
1981 births
Sportspeople from Sombor
Croats of Vojvodina
Association football forwards
Croatian footballers
Croatia under-21 international footballers
HNK Rijeka players
NK Zadar players
FC Admira Wacker Mödling players
NK Kamen Ingrad players
Flamurtari Vlorë players
NK Crikvenica players
NK Pomorac 1921 players
NK Krk players
Croatian Football League players
Austrian Football Bundesliga players
Kategoria Superiore players
First Football League (Croatia) players
Croatian expatriate footballers
Expatriate footballers in Austria
Croatian expatriate sportspeople in Austria
Expatriate footballers in Albania
Croatian expatriate sportspeople in Albania